Tulare Lake (Spanish: Laguna de Tache, Yokuts: Pah-áh-su) is a freshwater dry lake with residual wetlands and marshes in the southern San Joaquin Valley, California, United States. After Lake Cahuilla disappeared in the 17th century, Tulare Lake was the largest freshwater lake west of the Mississippi River and the third-largest freshwater lake entirely in the United States (after Lake Michigan and Lake Okeechobee in Florida), based upon surface area. A remnant of Pleistocene-era Lake Corcoran, Tulare Lake dried up after its tributary rivers were diverted for agricultural irrigation and municipal water uses.

The lake was named for the tule rush (Schoenoplectus acutus)  that lined the marshes and sloughs of its shores.  The lake was part of a  partially endorheic basin, at the south end of the San Joaquin Valley, where it received water from the Kern, Tule, and Kaweah Rivers, as well as from southern distributaries of the Kings.  It was separated from the rest of the San Joaquin Valley by tectonic subsidence and alluvial fans extending out from Los Gatos Creek in the Coast Ranges and the Kings River in the Sierra Nevada.  Above a threshold elevation of 207 to 210 feet, it overflowed into the San Joaquin River.  This happened in 19 of 29 years from 1850 to 1878.  No overflows occurred after 1878 due to increasing diversions of tributary waters for agricultural irrigation and municipal water uses, and by 1899, the lake was dry except for residual wetlands and occasional floods.

Tulare Lake was the largest of several similar lakes in its lower basin.  Most of the Kern River's flow first went into Kern Lake and Buena Vista Lake via the Kern River and Kern River Slough southwest and south of the site of Bakersfield.  If they overflowed, it was through the Kern River channel northwest through tule marshland and Goose Lake, into Tulare Lake.

History

For centuries, the Tachi tribe or Tache, a Yokuts people, built reed boats and fished in this lake prior to the arrival of Spanish and American colonists. The Yokuts had once numbered about 70,000. They had one of the highest regional population densities in pre-contact North America, which was possible because of the rich habitat.

The Yokuts also hunted deer, elk, and antelope, which were numerous along the lake's shoreline. During wet years, the lake was the terminus of the Western Hemisphere's southernmost Chinook salmon run via the San Joaquin River.

Even well after California became a state, Tulare Lake and its extensive marshes supported an important fishery: In 1888, in one three-month period, 73,500 pounds of fish were shipped through Hanford to San Francisco. It was also the source of a regional favorite, western pond turtles, which were relished as terrapin soup in San Francisco and elsewhere. The lake and surrounding wetlands were a significant stop for hundreds of thousands of birds migrating along the Pacific Flyway. Tulare Lake was written about by Mark Twain.

Following the floods of 1861–62 and 1867–68, the highest water on record reached between 216 and 220 ft above sea level. At that elevation, the lake overtopped the natural "spillway" (five miles west of the current community of Halls Corner on California State Route 41) and flowed northward into the sea via the Boggs and Fresno sloughs, the San Joaquin River, and San Francisco Bay.

In February and March 1938, heavy rains flooded the San Joaquin Valley, causing Tulare Lake to break the levee near Corcoran and flood  of cropland.

The expression "out in the tules", referring to the  sedges lining the lakeshore, is still common in the dialect of old Californian families and means "beyond far away".

Diversion and ecological decline
In the wake of the United States Civil War, late 19th-century settlers drained the surrounding marshes for early agriculture. The Kaweah, Kern, Kings, and Tule Rivers were dammed upstream in the Sierra Nevada Mountains, which turned their headwaters into a system of reservoirs. In the San Joaquin Valley, the state and counties built canals to deliver that water and divert the remaining flows for agricultural irrigation and municipal water uses. Tulare Lake was nearly dry by the early 20th century.

Enough water remained so the Alameda Naval Air Station used Tulare Lake as an outlying seaplane base during World War II and the early years of the Cold War. Flying boats could land on Tulare Lake when landing conditions were unsafe on San Francisco Bay.

In 1938 and 1955, the lake flooded, which prompted the construction of the Terminus and Success Dams on the Kaweah and Tule Rivers in Tulare County and Pine Flat Dam on the Kings River in Fresno County.  The lake bed is now a shallow basin of fertile soil, within the Central Valley of California, the most productive agricultural region of the United States. Farmers have irrigated the area for a century, so soil salination is becoming a concern.

The destruction of the terrestrial wetlands and the lake ecosystem habitats resulted in substantial losses of terrestrial animals, plants, aquatic animals, water plants, and resident and migrating birds. Although now dry, the lake occasionally reappears during floods following unusually high levels of rainfall or snow melt, as it did in 1983 and 1997.

See also

 Islands in Tulare Lake
 List of lakes in California
 Rancho Laguna de Tache (Limantour)
 San Luis National Wildlife Refuge
 Kesterson National Wildlife Refuge
 Great Valley Grasslands State Park
 Turlock Basin
 Mussel Slough Tragedy
 List of drying lakes

References

External links 
 Wildlife of Tulare Lake
 Tulare Lake restoration proposal
 San Joaquin Valley Groundwater Basin:  Tulare Lake Sub-basin
 Visualizing Californias soggy past : Explanatory article about the Geocurrents.info: Map at Geocurrents.info: Imagined satellite view of California in 1851 showing Tulare lake in its original form
 Original Location shown on Google Maps 

 
Endorheic lakes of California
Former lakes of the United States
San Joaquin Valley
Wetlands of California
History of the San Joaquin Valley
Landforms of Kings County, California
Geography of the San Joaquin Valley
Natural history of the Central Valley (California)
Kern River
Yokuts